Thin Ice may refer to:

Film
 Thin Ice (1919 film), an American silent drama film 
 Thin Ice (1937 film), an American comedy/romance film
 Thin Ice (2000 film), a British television thriller
 Thin Ice (2006 film), directed by Håkan Berthas, produced by Fredrik Gertten
 Thin Ice (2011 film), an American comedy-drama film 
 Thin Ice (2013 film), a documentary about climate change
 Jesse Stone: Thin Ice, a 2009 television film

Television
 Thin Ice (2006 TV series), a 2006 British comedy show
 "Thin Ice" (Doctor Who episode), 2017
 "Thin Ice", an episode of MacGyver (1985 TV series, season 3)
 "Thin Ice", a 2007 episode of All Saints
 "Thin Ice", a 2001 episode of Even Stevens
 Thin Ice (2020 TV series), a Swedish-Icelandic-French drama series

Other uses
 Thin Ice (band), an American hardcore band
 Thin Ice (game), a 1989 board game
 Thin Ice (novel), by Compton Mackenzie, 1956
 Thin Ice (audio drama), a 2011 Doctor Who drama
 "Thin Ice", a song by Little River Band from the 1986 album No Reins
 "Thin Ice", a song by Lenny Kravitz from his 1995 album Circus
 "The Thin Ice", a 1979 Pink Floyd song
 Thin Ice, a 1997 memoir by Bruce McCall

See also

 On thin ice (disambiguation)